William Bemis Draper (1804 - April 17, 1885) was an importer and  president of the Flushing National Bank (today, National Bank of New York City) in Flushing, New York.

Biography
He was one of seventeen children of Simeon Draper. His brother, Simeon, was Collector of the Port of New York (1864 - 1865). The last of the seventeen siblings to survive, Draper was born in Brookfield, Massachusetts.

For many years he was a member of the firm Draper, Cumble & Company. As a young man he established a branch of the silk importing firm in Paris, France. He retired from business in 1865. Draper was a fervent Republican Party (United States) member.

He died in 1885 at the age of 81. He was survived by a daughter, Mrs. Robert S. Browne, of Flushing. His funeral took place at St. George's Church in Flushing, and he was buried in Brookfield.

References

Businesspeople from Massachusetts
American bankers
New York (state) Republicans
1804 births
1885 deaths
People from Brookfield, Massachusetts
19th-century American businesspeople